Pellegrin may refer to:

 Simon-Joseph Pellegrin (1663-1745), French opera librettist
 Jacques Pellegrin (born 1944), French painter
 Jacques Pellegrin (1873–1944), French zoologist
 Harry G. Pellegrin (born 1957), U.S. musician, writer and artist
 François Pellegrin (1881–1965), French botanist, author abbreviation "Pellegr."